Riccò del Golfo di Spezia is a comune (municipality) in the Province of La Spezia in the Italian region Liguria, located about  southeast of Genoa and about  northeast of La Spezia.

Physical Geography 
The territory of Riccò del Golfo lies in the southernmost part of the middle and lower val di Vara, in the minor valley of the Riccò affluent of the Vara River, behind the Gulf of La Spezia.

The territory is part of the Regional Nature Park of Montemarcello-Magra-Vara. A woodland path, which passes by the village of Casella and the Sella della Cigoletta, marked as number 7 by the CAI, affords a connection with Vernazza and thus the coast of the Cinque Terre.

Infrastructure and Transportation

Roads 
The municipal territory of Riccò del Golfo di Spezia is crossed principally by the strada statale 1 Via Aurelia which affords a road link with Beverino, to the north, and the provincial capital La Spezia to the south. Further territorial road links include the provinciale 38 per Trezzo (Beverino) - which intersects with the Aurelia at the centre of Pian di Barca - and the provinciale 17, at the San Benedetto junction on the statale 1, which leads north into the municipal territory of Beverino.

Urban Transportation 
From the municipalities of Beverino, Brugnato, La Spezia, Sesta Godano and Varese Ligure, a local public transport system provides daily bus connections with Riccò del Golfo di Spezia and other villages in the municipal territory.

References

Cities and towns in Liguria